The Chicago, St. Paul, Minneapolis, and Omaha Depot was a depot for the Chicago, St. Paul, Minneapolis and Omaha Railway.  It is located on Fourth Street at First Avenue in Westbrook, Cottonwood County, Minnesota, United States.   It was added to the National Register of Historic Places on June 13, 1986.  It is now the Westbrook Heritage House Museum with indoor and outdoor exhibits on local history.

References

External links
 Westbrook Heritage House Museum - Museums of Minnesota

Railway stations on the National Register of Historic Places in Minnesota
Railway stations in the United States opened in 1900
Westbrook
Museums in Cottonwood County, Minnesota
Former railway stations in Minnesota
National Register of Historic Places in Cottonwood County, Minnesota
History museums in Minnesota